The al-Wadiah War was a military conflict which broke out on 27 November 1969 between Saudi Arabia and the People's  Republic of South Yemen after PRSY forces seized the town of al-Wadiah on the PRSY-Saudi Arabian border. The conflict ended on 6 December when Saudi forces retook al-Wadiah.

Background
The town was placed along the contentious border of South Yemen and Saudi Arabia, and had some fifteen years prior, in 1954/5, been the site of a border dispute between the Saudis and the British.

Al-Wadiah had previously been part of the Qu'aiti Sultanate, itself part of the Protectorate of South Arabia, which had been incorporated into the People's Democratic Republic of Yemen following the withdrawal of British forces from the region. The PRSY therefore considered the town as part of its territory. The Saudi government however saw al-Wadiah as part of their own territory, as well as a frontier in confrontations with the PRSY. There were also rumors of oil and water deposits around the town, thereby aggravating the dispute.

Simultaneously PRSY-Saudi relations had been incredibly tense, with Faisal of Saudi Arabia regarding the left-wing government with extreme hostility, which was in turn reciprocated by the PRSY, which supported the overthrow of the Gulf monarchies. The Saudi government went so far as to fund and arm South Yemeni dissidents, and encouraged them to conduct raids across the border into South Yemen. The PRSY accused the Saudi government of planning further attacks in November 1969.

History

PRSY Advance
In November 1969, the Saudis built a road to al-Wadiah and garrisoned soldiers there, incorporating it into the Kingdom. The PRSY government claimed that the Saudis had occupied al-Wadiah in order to secure potential oil reserves in the area. The Saudi government in turn accused the PRSY of seizing al-Wadiah.

On 27 November 1969, PRSY regular army units advanced on, and took, the town of al-Wadiah. Saudi forces deployed in the region were limited to some tribal militias, backed by some aircraft and artillery. A small section of the PRSY force began advancing on Sharurah, but was halted.

Having been informed of the PRSY advance, King Faisal ordered Sultan bin Abdulaziz, the Minister of Defense and Aviation, to expel PRSY forces. Sultan commissioned all units in the southern region for the task of attempting to reoccupy al-Wadiah within two days.

Saudi counterattack

The Royal Saudi Air Force also conducted a series of aerial bombardments on Yemeni positions. On one instance, English Electric Lightnings flown by Pakistani pilots from Khamis Airbase launched devastating rocket attacks on Yemeni supply lines.
These attacks continued over the course of two days, initially being directed at PRSY Army forces in the region, and later specifically at the PRSY leadership, whilst also attacking PRSY logistics.

The second phase (ground attack)
At 0945 in the morning, the Saudi ground offensive began advancing on Yemeni positions on two axes: A battalion of Saudi National Guard units, along with some other forces, advanced on Yemeni positions from the West. A second group, composed of exiled Yemenis and Saudi border guards, advanced on Yemeni positions from the east.

During the attack PRSY forces were divided into two pockets. A PRSY counterattack failed to unite the pockets. The following day clashes began at dawn, and continued throughout the day. The commander of the PRSY Brigade was killed in the fighting, following which PRSY forces began to withdraw. Saudi forces harassed PRSY forces during the retreat, although stopped at the border under orders.

The third phase (reinforcement)
Saudi forces then proceeded to take up defensive positions within al-Wadiah. Some abandoned PRSY equipment was seized.

The Saudis claimed to have occupied al-Wadiah by 5 December, and took journalists to the town. Saudi forces claimed to have killed 35 soldiers from the PRSY, and also claimed that they could have marched on Aden, the PRSY capital, had they not been ordered to stop at the border by King Faisal.

Aftermath
Following the conflict the Saudi government began a large scale program of construction of military sites in the region, whilst also deploying further military forces to Sharurah, close to al-Wadiah. Tensions continued, especially after the 1972 Tripoli Agreement, under which North and South Yemen agreed to merge, due to Saudi hostility to any merger. In March 1973 Saudi Arabia claimed that two PRSY MiGs had attacked al-Wadiah, although the PRSY denied any such incident, and claimed Saudi Arabia was searching for a pretext for military intervention in South Yemen. There was a brief warming of relations between the two countries in November 1977, although this soon lapsed and ambassadors were recalled by both countries. There were further reports of clashes in January 1978, including the shooting down of 4 RSAF Lightnings by a PRSY MiG, although this was denied. There were minor clashes in February 1987.

The issue of ownership was finally settled by the Treaty of Jeddah of 2000, which affirmed Saudi ownership of the town.

See also
Saudi–Yemeni War (1934), a preceding Saudi–Yemeni conflict
Houthi–Saudi Arabian conflict, a subsequent Saudi–Yemeni conflict
List of wars involving Yemen
Saudi Arabia–Yemen border

References

1969 in Saudi Arabia
Conflicts in 1969
South Yemen
Wars involving Yemen
1969 in Yemen
Proxy wars